The Ascot was made by Societe Buchet, Levallois-Perret, Seine, from 1914 to 1915. It was an Anglo-French product, the chassis being built for Hollingdrake Automobile Co. of Stockport, who fitted their own bodies, mainly being two-seaters and coupes. The engine was a 10 hp side-valve with the gearbox in unit with it. It was to sell for 195 pounds.

Defunct motor vehicle manufacturers of France